The Malagasy Sign Language is a sign language used for communication among hearing impaired people in Madagascar. An estimated 110,000 to 170,000  people (or 1% of the population of Madagascar) are deaf. It also shows similarities with the Norwegian Sign Language. Seven deaf schools in Madagascar are being sponsored by Evangelical Lutherans.

External links
 WikiSigns.org – Malagasy Sign Language Dictionary

References

Languages of Madagascar
Sign languages
French Sign Language family
Danish Sign Language family